Real Life Men and Women is a South Korea variety talk show program aired on MBN, with Shin Sung-woo, Yoon Jung-soo, Yang Se-hyung, Choi Jong-hoon, Han Eun-jung, Gong Hyun-joo, Sunny, and Chungha as the main cast for season 1. Leeteuk, Seo Eunkwang and Jang Do-yeon were added to season 2 to replace Shin Sung-woo, Choi Jong-hoon and Gong Hyun-joo.

Synopsis
It is a program that observes men and women’s reaction and action in a real situation. The entertainers will reveal their real lives. They will try to see the difference and similarities between women and men.

Cast

Season 1
Shin Sung-woo
Yoon Jung-soo
Yang Se-hyung
Choi Jong-hoon
Han Eun-jung
Gong Hyun-joo
Sunny
Chungha

Season 2
Yoon Jung-soo
Yang Se-hyung
Leeteuk
Seo Eunkwang
Han Eun-jung
Jang Do-yeon
Sunny
Chungha

Episodes

Season 1

Season 2

References

Korean-language television shows
2018 South Korean television series debuts